Peter McNamee may refer to:
 Peter McNamee (ice hockey)
 Peter McNamee (footballer)